The Pulteney Association was a small group of British investors who in 1792 purchased a large portion of the Western New York land tract known as the Phelps and Gorham Purchase. The Pulteney Associates were Sir William Pulteney, 5th Baronet (1729–1805), a Scottish lawyer who owned nine-twelfths; William Hornby, former Governor of Bombay, who owned two-twelfths; and Patrick Colquhoun, a Scottish merchant with a one-twelfth share. Some of their heirs owned land in western New York into the 1920s, with the last parcel of The Pulteney Association property, 10 acres (40,000 m2), being sold in December 1926.

History
The United States forced the previous occupants, nations of the Iroquois Confederacy, to cede the lands as they had been allies of Great Britain. After Massachusetts' claim was settled, New York state intended to sell the land for development and settlement.

Phelps and Gorham were to pay $1,000,000 in three equal annual installments for this land, payable in certain Massachusetts securities that were then valued at 20 cents on the dollar. Under the terms of the purchase agreement, they took title only when they had extinguished the Indian title.

In 1790, with the price of Massachusetts securities soaring, Phelps and Gorham became unable to pay the second installment on the purchase contract, and the preemptive right to lands west of the Genesee River reverted to Massachusetts. The state resold that right to Robert Morris, a signer of the Declaration of Independence, a financier of the American Revolution, and the wealthiest man in the United States. (See Holland Land Company, The Holland Purchase, and The Morris Reserve.)  Phelps and Gorham received the deed to the lands east of the Genesee to which they had extinguished title, but they conveyed all of the remaining unsold land to Morris.

In 1792, Morris's London agent, William Temple Franklin, grandson of Benjamin Franklin, sold  of the Phelps and Gorham Purchase east of the Genesee River to The Pulteney Associates. The Pulteney Purchase, or the Genesee Tract, as it was also known, comprised all of the present counties of Ontario, Steuben and Yates, as well as portions of Allegany, Livingston, Monroe, Schuyler and Wayne counties.  After Sir William Pulteney's death in 1805, it was known as the Pulteney Estate.

The Pulteney Estate was managed by a series of agents, including:
 Cpt. Charles Williamson (1792–1801)
 Robert Troup (1801–1832)
 Represented by John Johnstone, John Heslop and Robert Scott, successively as sub-agents, until 1814
 Joeseph Fellows (1832–1871)
 Edward A. Kingsland (1871–1894)
 Judge Mason and Mr. Rose (1894–1900), Mr. Rose thereafter

References

External links
 "Sir William Johnstone Pulteney and the Scottish Origins of Western New York", Crooked Lake Review, Summer 2004
 "The Pulteney Estates in the Genesee Lands", Crooked Lake Review
 "The Pulteney Estate during the Nineteenth Century", Crooked Lake Review, Fall 2003
 "The Field Notes of Col. Hugh Maxwell's Pre-emption Line Survey in the Phelps and Gorham Purchase", Crooked Lake Review, Spring 2004

Former regions and territories of the United States
History of New York (state)
Aboriginal title in New York
1792 in New York (state)